J Eugene McAteer (February 28, 1916–May 26, 1967) was a San Francisco Supervisor (1953–1958) and a California State Senator (1959–1967). He coauthored legislation to start the San Francisco Bay Conservation and Development Commission.  The commission's first director, Joseph Bodovitz, said, "What people tend to forget now is how unusual it was to have anybody of McAteer's stature interested in an environmental issue in the sixties."

In 1967, McAteer, a Democrat, announced his intent to run for Mayor of San Francisco in the November election, opposing the Democratic incumbent John F. Shelley as well as perennial Republican candidate, Harold Dobbs.  The campaign was cut short by McAteer's untimely death at age 51 in May of that year, while playing handball at the Olympic Club's downtown facility.  Shortly thereafter, attorney Joseph L. Alioto, then working on the McAteer campaign, entered the race and subsequently won that fall's election, eventually serving two terms in the office of Mayor.

References 

1916 births
1967 deaths
San Francisco Bay Area politicians
Democratic Party California state senators
San Francisco Board of Supervisors members
20th-century American politicians
United States Navy personnel of World War II